The Bukoba lampeye (Lacustricola bukobanus) is a species of fish in the family Poeciliidae. It is found in Kenya, Tanzania, and Uganda. Its natural habitats are rivers, swamps, freshwater marshes, and intermittent freshwater marshes.

References

Aplocheilichthys
Fish described in 1924
Taxonomy articles created by Polbot
Taxobox binomials not recognized by IUCN